Gajamukta is a 1994 Bengali adventure drama film directed by Ajit Lahiri and produced by Dilip Sur based on a same name novel of Narayan Sanyal published in 1961. This is the debut film of Riya Sen in Bengali film as a child artist. Music of the movie was scored by Bhupen Hazarika.

Plot 
This is the story of hunting elephant for yearly ritual in Assam. This is actually a game of death.

Cast
 Soumitra Chatterjee
 Tom Alter
 Gyanesh Mukherjee
 Basabi Nandi
 Moon Moon Sen
 Abhishek Chatterjee
 Riya Sen
 Biju Phukan
 Ratna Das
 Noni Ganguly
 Subrata Sensharma

References

External links
 

1994 films
Bengali-language Indian films
1990s Bengali-language films
Films based on works by Narayan Sanyal
Films scored by Bhupen Hazarika
Indian adventure drama films
Films about elephants